is a Japanese football player who plays for MIO Biwako Shiga on loan from Sagan Tosu.

Playing career
Wada was born in Tochigi Prefecture on July 5, 1995. After graduating from Hannan University, he joined J3 League club FC Ryukyu in 2018. 

Wada joined J1 League side Sagan Tosu in January 2021 after a trial, despite having made no appearances for Kagoshima United the previous season.

He joined the Brisbane Roar in the A-League on 4 Feb 2022 as a loan player. He took a month to gain enough match fitness to play, then only made 4 appearances before being dropped. He left the club at the conclusion of the season.

Club statistics
Updated to September 13 2022.

References

External links

1995 births
Living people
Hannan University alumni
Association football people from Tochigi Prefecture
Japanese footballers
FC Ryukyu players
Kagoshima United FC players
Sagan Tosu players
Brisbane Roar FC players
J2 League players
J3 League players
Association football forwards